Matteini is an Italian surname. Notable people with the surname include:

Claudio Matteini (1923–2003), Italian footballer
Davide Matteini (born 1982), Italian footballer
Michele Alberto Matteini, art historian
Teodoro Matteini (1753–1831), Italian painter

Italian-language surnames
Patronymic surnames
Surnames from given names